Flying Phantom can refer to:
 Flying Phantom, a tug built in 1981 for the Clyde Shipping Company that sank on the River Clyde in 2007
 Flying Phantom (catamaran), a one-design catamaran built for planing over L-shaped daggerboards
 Flying Phantom Ship,  a 1969 anime feature film directed by Hiroshi Ikeda and produced by Toei Animation.